Eleanor Inez Montgomery (November 13, 1946 – December 28, 2013) was an American high jumper. She was a two-time Olympian, placing 8th in 1964 and 19th in 1968, and a Tigerbelle, the name of the Tennessee State University women's track and field program. Montgomery set her personal best in the high jump (1.80 m) on July 6, 1969 at the US National Championships in Dayton, which was an American record at that time. She also competed in the long jump and the pentathlon during her career.

After retiring from competitions Montgomery worked for the Cleveland Municipal School District and participated in the Interchurch Youth Activities Program as an organizer and official at athletics competitions. Montgomery was also the Executive Director of the National Football League Players' Association Youth Camp and assisted with the Special Olympics. In 1976 she was inducted into the Greater Cleveland Sports Hall of Fame, and in 2013 into the National Track and Field Hall of Fame.

Achievements

References

External links 
 
 
 

1946 births
2013 deaths
American female high jumpers
American female long jumpers
American heptathletes
Athletes (track and field) at the 1963 Pan American Games
Athletes (track and field) at the 1967 Pan American Games
Athletes (track and field) at the 1964 Summer Olympics
Athletes (track and field) at the 1968 Summer Olympics
Olympic track and field athletes of the United States
Track and field athletes from Cleveland
Tennessee State Lady Tigers track and field athletes
Pan American Games medalists in athletics (track and field)
Pan American Games gold medalists for the United States
Medalists at the 1963 Pan American Games
Medalists at the 1967 Pan American Games